Clark Creek Natural Area is a publicly owned, natural preservation area encompassing  off Mississippi Highway 24 approximately  west of Woodville, Mississippi. The state park features approximately 50 waterfalls, some with up to  drops. The park is used for hiking, bird watching, and geocaching.

History

The park was established in 1978 through the efforts of the Mississippi Wildlife Heritage Committee, the Nature Conservancy, Wilkinson County, David Bramlette, International Paper Company and the Mississippi Department of Wildlife, Fisheries and Parks.

Flora and fauna
The nature area has a mix of hardwood and pine forest with large beech and magnolia trees. The park includes the world record Mexican plum and bigleaf snowbell and the state of Mississippi record hophornbeam. Several uncommon trees that can be seen are Southern sugar maple, serviceberry, umbrella tree, pyramid magnolia, chinquapin oak and witch-hazel. The globally rare Carolina magnolia vine and many others are well marked. A checklist of the vascular plants was recorded in 1982, and it was one of the first surveys of plants in southwestern Mississippi.

The park includes migratory birds, various snake varieties (both venomous and non-venomous), a rare land snail, white-tail deer, chipmunks, the Southern red belly dace (a state endangered fish), foxes, coyotes, squirrels, armadillos, feral pigs, bobcats, cottontail rabbits and black bear as well as many other species.

Activities and amenities
The park has both primitive and improved trails. The improved trails have been paved with pea gravel and include steep wooden stairs. Clark Creek's steeply sloping bluffs increase the difficulty of hiking. Eight geocaches are located in the park.

Restrictions
The state has imposed various restrictions on visitors: park use is limited to pedestrian traffic year round; motorized vehicles are not allowed; hunting is prohibited; potable water is not available on the trails; camping is not permitted; ropes may not be used for climbing; hikers are required to stay on paths or in creeks.
Dogs must be leashed at all times.

References

External links
Clark Creek Natural Area Mississippi Department of Wildlife, Fisheries, and Parks
Clark Creek Natural Area Map Mississippi Department of Wildlife, Fisheries, and Parks

State parks of Mississippi
Protected areas of Wilkinson County, Mississippi
Protected areas established in 1978